Seïd Khiter (born 19 January 1985) is a French former professional footballer who played as a striker.

Club career
Khiter was born in Roubaix, Nord. On 21 January 2009, he joined Vannes OC on loan from Valenciennes FC and on 5 August 2009 he moved to RC Strasbourg, again on loan.

International career
Although he represented France at junior level, Khiter indicated in 2015 that he would join the Algeria national team in the near future. However, due to the FIFA laws in place at the time, he was unable to do this as he was over the age of 21.

Honours
Vannes
 Coupe de la Ligue: runner-up 2008–09

References

External links
 
 
 

1985 births
Living people
Sportspeople from Roubaix
French sportspeople of Algerian descent
French footballers
Footballers from Hauts-de-France
Association football forwards
France youth international footballers
Ligue 1 players
Ligue 2 players
Challenger Pro League players
RC Lens players
AC Ajaccio players
LB Châteauroux players
Valenciennes FC players
Vannes OC players
RC Strasbourg Alsace players
Stade Lavallois players
Royal Excel Mouscron players
Royal Antwerp F.C. players
K.V. Woluwe-Zaventem players
Sint-Eloois-Winkel Sport players
French expatriate footballers
French expatriate sportspeople in Belgium
Expatriate footballers in Belgium